Guillermina is a female given name with Spanish origins and may refer to:

Guillermina López Balbuena (born 1973), Mexican politician
Guillermina Bravo (1920 – 2013), Mexican ballet dancer, choreographer and ballet director
Guillermina Candelario (born 1970), Dominican Republic Olympic weightlifter
Guillermina Jiménez Chabolla (born 1930), known by her stage name Flor Silvestre, Mexican singer, actress, and equestrienne
Guillermina Dulché, Mexican painter
Guillermina Green (1922–2006), also known as Guillermina Grin, Spanish film actress
Guillermina Lozano, American geneticist
Guillermina Bravo Montaño (born 1949), Colombian politician
Guillermina Casique Vences (born 1961), Mexican politician
María Guillermina Valdes Villalva (also known as Guillermina Valdez de Villalva, 1939–1991) was a Chicana scholar and activist